Kewney is a surname. Notable people with the surname include:

Alf Kewney (1882–1959), English rugby player
Arthur V. Kewney (1873–1956), Australian horseracing official
Guy Kewney (1946–2010), British journalist

See also
Kenney (name)